John Anthony Caldwell (born 6 July 1938) is an English musicologist and composer.

Life
Caldwell was born in Bebington, Cheshire and studied the organ at the Matthay School of Music in Liverpool, becoming a Fellow of the Royal College of Organists in 1957.  He studied at Keble College, Oxford, obtaining his B.A. in 1960, B.Mus. in 1961 and D.Phil. in 1965.  For his doctorate, he transcribed and edited a manuscript of English liturgical organ music from between 1548 and 1650. He was an assistant lecturer at Bristol University from 1963 to 1966, before returning to Oxford University as a lecturer in 1966, holding this position until 1996 when he was appointed a Reader.  He was a Fellow of Keble College from 1967 to 1992.  He became a senior research fellow of Jesus College, Oxford in 1999 and given the title of Professor by the University Distinctions Committee. He became an Emeritus Fellow on his retirement in 2005.

His main areas of interest are medieval and Renaissance music, music theory and keyboard music. In one of his late articles dedicated to early witnesses of Western modal music and music theory he suggested to consider modality not to be bound up with 8 "standard" church tones, but to treat it as a unifying concept for Western chant.

His compositions include the opera-oratorio Good Friday, first performed in Oxford in February 1998  and Ecce sacerdos magnus for the Choirs of All Saints' Church, Northampton.

He has a wife, two children and five grandchildren.

References

1938 births
Living people
People from Bebington
English musicologists
Alumni of Keble College, Oxford
Academics of the University of Bristol
Fellows of Keble College, Oxford
Fellows of Jesus College, Oxford
English classical organists
British male organists
English classical composers
20th-century classical composers
21st-century classical composers
English male classical composers
20th-century English composers
21st-century organists
20th-century British male musicians
21st-century British male musicians
Male classical organists